was a Japanese film director and screenwriter. While lesser-known internationally than contemporaries such as Akira Kurosawa, Kenji Mizoguchi and Yasujirō Ozu, he was a household figure in his home country, beloved by both critics and audiences from the 1940s to the 1960s. Among his best known films are Carmen Comes Home (1951), Japan's first colour feature, Tragedy of Japan (1953), Twenty-Four Eyes (1954), You Were Like a Wild Chrysanthemum (1955), Times of Joy and Sorrow (1957), The Ballad of Narayama (1958), and The River Fuefuki (1960).

Biography

Early years
Keisuke Kinoshita was born Masakichi Kinoshita on 5 December 1912, in Hamamatsu, Shizuoka Prefecture, as the fourth of eight children of merchant Shūkichi Kinoshita and his wife Tama. His family manufactured pickles and owned a grocery store. A film fan already in early years, he vowed to become a filmmaker, but faced opposition from his parents.

When he was in high school, a film crew arrived in Hamamatsu for location shooting one day. He befriended actor Bando Junosuke when the latter came to his store for local products. Bando later helped him run away to Kyoto where most period films were made, but his grandfather came and took him back home the next day. His determination to become a filmmaker finally moved his parents into letting him pursue his career. His mother secured him an introduction to the Shochiku Kamata studios, where Ozu, Mikio Naruse, and other famous directors worked.

Without a university education, however, Kinoshita was not allowed to work as an assistant director and had to start as a photographer; he applied to the Oriental Photography School and graduated before he was finally admitted into Shochiku. There, he first worked in the film processing laboratory, then as a camera assistant, before he became assistant director for Yasujirō Shimazu and later Kōzaburō Yoshimura. In 1940, Kinoshita was drafted into the Sino-Japanese War and went to China, but returned the following year due to an injury.

Career as director
Kinoshita re-entered Shochiku and was promoted to director in 1943. Adapting a popular play by Kazuo Kikuta, he made the comedy The Blossoming Port with a large cast and budget. The same year saw the emergence of another new director, Akira Kurosawa, but it was Kinoshita who won the much coveted New Director Award at the end of that year.

Like many Japanese filmmakers in the late 1930s and early 1940s, Kinoshita directed a film which on the surface endorsed the expansionist policy of the militarist regime, Army (1944). Yet, the famous final scene showed a mother grieving her son's departure for the front instead of cheering him. Although it passed the censors, Kinoshita met with harsh criticism and was not allowed to direct another film until the end of the Second World War. He later argued, "I can’t lie to myself in my dramas. I couldn’t direct something that was like shaking hands and saying, 'Come die.'" He returned to his hometown Hamamatsu, where he waited for the war to end.

His first post war film was Morning for the Osone Family (1946) about a family torn apart by war and conflicts between its liberal-minded and pro-militarist members. The final scene, with the remaining family greeting the rising sun, was demanded by the American censorship board against Kinoshita's objections. In the following years, he worked in a variety of genres, including comedy, period and contemporary drama, ghost story, and thriller. Highly successful was the romantic comedy Here’s to the Young Lady (1949) starring Setsuko Hara.

In 1951, Kinoshita travelled to France to meet his idol, French director René Clair. As Kinoshita stated, another reason for the travel was to see his home country from a different perspective. The same year saw the release of the musical comedy Carmen Comes Home, Japan's first colour feature. Due to technical and financial reasons, a black-and-white version was also filmed and released. Carmen Comes Home was the first collaboration of Kinoshita with actress Hideko Takamine, who appeared in many of his later films. Early on, Kinoshita gathered a steady group of co-workers around him: Takamine, Kinuyo Tanaka, Yoshiko Kuga, Keiji Sada and Yūko Mochizuki had repeated starring or bigger supporting roles, while his brother Chuji (also credited Tadashi) scored, and cinematographer Hiroshi Kusuda photographed many of his films. His sister Yoshiko Kusuda, wife of Hiroshi Kusuda, wrote the screenplay for Farewell to Dream (1956).

The mid-1950s marked the release of two of Kinoshita's most acclaimed films, Twenty-Four Eyes (1954), a portrait of a school teacher who sees the dreams of her young pupils fall apart due to economical constraints and the war, and You Were Like a Wild Chrysanthemum (1955), a Meiji era period drama about the unfulfilled love between two teenagers. Also highly popular was the lighthouse keeper drama Times of Joy and Sorrow (1957), which was repeatedly remade in later years, including one version by Kinoshita himself. The Ballad of Narayama (1958), a highly stylised period drama about the legendary ubasute practice, was entered into the 19th Venice International Film Festival, but met with very mixed reactions.

By the mid 1960's, Kinoshita had turned solely to television work. Film historian Donald Richie saw the period war drama The River Fuefuki (1960) and The Scent of Incense (1964), which follows a troubled mother-daughter-relationship over a span of 4 decades, as the director's last notable works. Alexander Jacoby also found the 1960 satire Spring Dreams noteworthy, which he called "quirkily enjoyable".

Like directors of the previous generation as Ozu and Naruse, Kinoshita stayed loyal to one film studio (Shochiku) before turning to television, and often worked for Shochiku even in later years, while other directors of his generation as Yoshimura and Kaneto Shindō, and even the older Heinosuke Gosho, had started working independently for different studios by the early 1950s.

Although few concrete details have emerged about Kinoshita's personal life, his homosexuality was widely known in the film world. Screenwriter and frequent collaborator Yoshio Shirasaka recalls the "brilliant scene" Kinoshita made with the handsome, well-dressed assistant directors he surrounded himself with. His 1959 film Farewell to Spring has been called "Japan's first gay film" for the emotional intensity depicted between its male characters.

Kinoshita died on December 30, 1998, of a stroke. His grave is in Engaku-ji in Kamakura, very near to that of his fellow Shochiku director, Yasujirō Ozu.

Filmography

Main themes and style
Although not limited to a certain genre, the two main veins of Kinoshita's work were comedy and melodrama. A major theme was the depiction of national history in personal terms, chronicling families or communities over a certain span of time. Also, his films often concentrated on the sufferings of children in oppressive circumstances, and showed a general sympathy with the socially marginalised. Working less on an analytical but an intuitive level, Kinoshita's films showed, according to Alexander Jacoby, an occasional simplicity and naivety, yet in the cases of Twenty-Four Eyes and You Were Like a Wild Chrysanthemum, they were among the most purely moving of Japanese cinema. Donald Richie also pointed out the satire and comedy of character in Kinoshita's comedy films, and an emotional earnestness which exceeded sentimentality in his serious films. Sometimes critical of his later work, Richie detected an increasing traditionalism in films like The Ballad of Narayama, The River Fuefuki and Scent of Incense.

Although he often adapted literary works from writers like Tōson Shimazaki, Kunio Kishida and Isoko Hatano, many of his screenplays were based on his original idea. Kinoshita explained his prolific output with the fact that he "can’t help it. Ideas for films have always just popped into my head like scraps of paper into a wastebasket." Some of his scripts were realised by other directors, including the acknowledged directorial debut of actress Kinuyo Tanaka, Love Letter (1953).

Kinoshita was also an avid stylist who experimented with cinematic form in his films. He used expressionist camera angles in Carmen's Innocent Love, daguerreotype-like framing of images in She Was Like a Wild Chrysanthemum, or partial tinting to evoke the impression of Japanese woodblock prints in The River Fuefuki. In A Japanese Tragedy, he interspersed newsreel footage, and drew upon kabuki stage effects in The Ballad of Narayama. The Snow Flurry told its story in a fragmented, nonlinear manner, preceding the New Wave.

Influence
In 1946 Masaki Kobayashi became Kinoshita's assistant and later formed with him, Akira Kurosawa, and Kon Ichikawa a directors group called Shiki no kai (The Four Horsemen Club). The goal was to produce films for a younger audience, but only one project was realised, Kurosawa's Dodes'ka-den (1970).

Director Tadashi Imai was an outspoken admirer of Kinoshita's work, and Nagisa Ōshima named The Garden of Women as the film which led to his decision to become a filmmaker himself in his 1995 documentary 100 Years of Japanese Cinema.

Honours and awards
Kinoshita received the Order of the Rising Sun in 1984 and was awarded the Order of Culture and Person of Cultural Merit in 1991 by the Japanese government. In 1999, he received the Blue Ribbon Special Award and the Mainichi Film Concours Special Award for his life achievement. His birth town Hamamatsu established the "Keisuke Kinoshita Memorial Museum" to commemorate him.

A retrospective on Kinoshita with 15 of his films was held at the Lincoln Center, New York, in 2012. In 2013, five of Kinoshita's films — Jubilation Street (1944), Woman (1948), Engagement Ring (1950), Farewell to Dream (1956) and A Legend or Was It? (1963) — were screened in the Forum section of the 63rd Berlin International Film Festival.

Awarded films
Morning for the Osone Family
Kinema Junpo Award for Best Film

Carmen Comes Home
Mainichi Film Concours for Best Screenplay

A Japanese Tragedy
Blue Ribbon Award for Best Screenplay
Mainichi Film Concours for Best Screenplay

Twenty-Four Eyes
Blue Ribbon Award for Best Film and Best Screenplay
Mainichi Film Concours for Best Film, Best Director and Best Screenplay
Kinema Junpo Award for Best Film
Golden Globe Award for Best Foreign Film
voted at position #6 on the 2009 All Time Best Japanese Movies list by readers of Kinema Junpo

The Garden of Women
Blue Ribbon Award for Best Screenplay
Mainichi Film Concours for Best Director and Best Screenplay

The Rose on His Arm
Golden Globe Award for Best Foreign Film

The Ballad of Narayama
Mainichi Film Concours for Best Film and Best Director
Kinema Junpo Award for Best Film and Best Director

Immortal Love
nominated for the Academy Award for Best Foreign Language Film

References

Bibliography

External links
 
 

1912 births
1998 deaths
People from Hamamatsu
Japanese military personnel of World War II
Japanese film directors
Japanese male screenwriters
LGBT film directors
Recipients of the Order of the Rising Sun, 4th class
Persons of Cultural Merit
Gay screenwriters
Japanese gay writers
Japanese LGBT screenwriters
20th-century Japanese LGBT people